Bacanius is a genus of clown beetles in the family Histeridae. There are more than 70 described species in Bacanius.

Species
These 77 species belong to the genus Bacanius:

 Bacanius acicularis (Fauvel, 1891)
 Bacanius acuminatus Casey, 1893
 Bacanius africanus Bickhardt, 1911
 Bacanius albiusi Gomy, 1978
 Bacanius ambiguus Schmidt, 1893
 Bacanius andrei Gomy, 2001
 Bacanius angolensis Thérond, 1962
 Bacanius auctus (Marseul, 1879)
 Bacanius baloghi Gomy, 1977
 Bacanius bicolor Mazur, 1975
 Bacanius borbonicus Gomy, 1970
 Bacanius bougainvillei Gomy, 1976
 Bacanius cavisternus Gomy, 1980
 Bacanius charriei Gomy, 1978
 Bacanius collettei Gomy, 1999
 Bacanius comorensis Gomy, 1978
 Bacanius consobrinus (Aubé, 1850)
 Bacanius convergens Schmidt, 1896
 Bacanius cooki Gomy, 1976
 Bacanius crenulatus Wenzel, 1944
 Bacanius creolus Gomy, 1970
 Bacanius debilitans Casey, 1893
 Bacanius dentrecasteauxi Gomy, 1976
 Bacanius fauveli Wenzel, 1955
 Bacanius ferrugineus Bickhardt, 1918
 Bacanius franzi Gomy, 1970
 Bacanius gestroi Schmidt, 1893
 Bacanius globulinus Casey, 1893
 Bacanius gomyi Yélamos, 1996
 Bacanius gourvesi Gomy, 1981
 Bacanius granulosus Gomy, 1980
 Bacanius greensladei Gomy, 1988
 Bacanius hatchi Wenzel, 1960
 Bacanius hemisphaeroides (Marseul, 1879)
 Bacanius humicola Marseul, 1856
 Bacanius insularis Gomy, 1978
 Bacanius irlanda Mazur & Sawoniewicz, 2008
 Bacanius kapleri Gomy, 1999
 Bacanius kaszabi Gomy, 1977
 Bacanius kurbatovi Gomy & Tishechkin, 1993
 Bacanius lableri (Reichardt, 1941)
 Bacanius laperousei Gomy, 1976
 Bacanius lawrencei Gomy, 1992
 Bacanius leleupi Thérond, 1965
 Bacanius lucidus Thérond, 1965
 Bacanius mameti Gomy, 1970
 Bacanius martensi Gomy, 1992
 Bacanius mikado (Lewis, 1892)
 Bacanius misellus J.L.LeConte, 1853
 Bacanius montanus Mazur & Sawoniewicz, 2008
 Bacanius niponixua Lewis, 1879
 Bacanius nobleti Gomy, 1981
 Bacanius norfolcensis (Lea, 1925)
 Bacanius papulatus Cooman, 1933
 Bacanius peckorum Gomy, 1992
 Bacanius permirus (Marseul, 1879)
 Bacanius perreti Gomy, 1981
 Bacanius peyrierasi Gomy, 1969
 Bacanius punctiformis (J. L. LeConte, 1853)
 Bacanius punctiger (Fauvel, 1891)
 Bacanius quartus Thérond, 1967
 Bacanius remingtoni Wenzel, 1955
 Bacanius riftensis Gomy, 1981
 Bacanius rugisternus Wenzel, 1944
 Bacanius scalptus Lewis, 1888
 Bacanius schmidti Gomy, 1969
 Bacanius similis Mazur, 1975
 Bacanius subcarinatus Wenzel & Dybas, 1941
 Bacanius sulcilisternus Wenzel
 Bacanius sulcisternus Wenzel, 1944
 Bacanius suturalis (Lea, 1925)
 Bacanius szyszkoi Mazur, 1975
 Bacanius tantillus J. L. LeConte, 1853
 Bacanius therondi Gomy, 1969
 Bacanius vadoni Gomy, 1969
 Bacanius verschureni Thérond, 1959
 Bacanius wauensis Gomy, 1981

References

Further reading

 
 

Histeridae
Articles created by Qbugbot